The Ordre du Mérite Saharien (Order of Saharan Merit) was established in 1958 as a reward for social, scientific, economic or administrative services rendered by French or foreign persons who participated in the development of Saharan regions. The medal is fashioned in the form of the Agadez Cross, a traditional emblem of the Tuareg clans inhabiting the area of the former Sultanate of Agadez in Agadez, Niger.

The order was deprecated by decree on 3 December 1963, and superseded by the Ordre National du Mérite. Extant members of the order are permitted to wear their original decorations.

Classes
The Order has three classes:
Commandeur (Commander)
Officier (Officer)
Chevalier (Knight)

References
 
 

Awards established in 1958
1963 disestablishments
Merite Saharien